Kotti Chave (born Björn Julius Haraldsson Chave; 18 September 1911 – 4 May 1986) was a Finnish-born Swedish film actor. He was the son of the theatre actor Harald Sandberg.

Selected filmography
 In the Hour of Trial (1915)
 The False Millionaire (1931)
 Skipper's Love (1931)
 His Life's Match (1932)
 The Lady Becomes a Maid (1936)
 The Family Secret (1936)
 Sara Learns Manners (1937)
 John Ericsson, Victor of Hampton Roads (1937)
 Dollar (1938)
 Good Friends and Faithful Neighbours (1938)
 With Open Arms (1940)
 Första divisionen (1941)
 The Fight Continues (1941)
 Goransson's Boy (1941)
 Life and Death (1943)
 Katrina (1943)
 The Old Clock at Ronneberga (1944)
 The Lady in Black (1958)
 Mannequin in Red (1958)
 Musik ombord (1958)
 Fridolf Stands Up! (1958)
 Rider in Blue (1959)
 Good Friends and Faithful Neighbours (1960)

References

Bibliography 
 Lawrence J. Quirk. The films of Ingrid Bergman. Carol Pub Group, 1975.

External links 
 

1911 births
1986 deaths
Male actors from Helsinki
People from Uusimaa Province (Grand Duchy of Finland)
Swedish male film actors
Finnish male film actors
Swedish-speaking Finns
Finnish emigrants to Sweden